The Farmers and Merchants Union Bank is a historic commercial building at 159 West James Street in Columbus, Wisconsin. Built in 1919, it is the last of eight "jewel box" bank buildings designed by Louis Sullivan, and the next to last to be constructed.  It was declared a National Historic Landmark in 1976 for its architecture.

Description and history
The Farmers and Merchants Union Bank is located in downtown Columbus, at the southern corner of West James Street and South Dickason Boulevard.  It is a tall single-story in height, its exterior finished in tapestry brick with marble and terra cotta trim.  The main facade is two bays wide, with the building entrance in the right bay.  Above these bays is an elaborately carved tall marble lintel, above which a half-round stained glass window is framed by a stone garland.  The side of the building, facing South Dickason, has a band of five windows.  The interior is small yet spacious, with a bank of teller stations on the left side.

The building was designed by Sullivan in 1919, and its construction was personally supervised by him.  It was the last of his so-called "jewel box" designs of small bank buildings in smaller midwestern communities, and the second-to-last to be completed.  It is one of two Sullivan designs in Wisconsin; the other, the Harold C. Bradley House, is also a National Historic Landmark.  The design of this bank is fully documented in Sullivan's 1924 A System of Architectural Ornament, published not long before his death.

Other Louis Sullivan "jewel boxes"
Henry Adams Building, Algona, Iowa (1913)
Home Building Association Company, Newark, Ohio (1914)
Merchants' National Bank, Grinnell, Iowa (1914)
National Farmer's Bank, Owatonna, Minnesota (1908)
People's Federal Savings and Loan Association, Sidney, Ohio (1918)
Peoples Savings Bank, Cedar Rapids, Iowa (1912)
Purdue State Bank, West Lafayette, Indiana (1914)

See also
List of National Historic Landmarks in Wisconsin
National Register of Historic Places listings in Columbia County, Wisconsin

References

External links

National Historic Landmarks in Wisconsin
Commercial buildings completed in 1919
Buildings and structures in Columbia County, Wisconsin
Louis Sullivan buildings
Bank buildings on the National Register of Historic Places in Wisconsin
Columbus, Wisconsin
Art Nouveau architecture in the United States
Art Nouveau commercial buildings
National Register of Historic Places in Columbia County, Wisconsin